Tallykul (Tallıkül) is a rural locality (a village) in Udryakbashevsky Selsoviet, Blagovarsky District, Bashkortostan, Russia. The population was 88 as of 2010. There is 1 street.

Geography 
Tallykul is located 27 km southwest of Yazykovo (the district's administrative centre) by road. Buzoulyk is the nearest rural locality.

References 

Rural localities in Blagovarsky District